The Los Angeles Film Critics Association Award for Best Supporting Actor was an award given annually by the Los Angeles Film Critics Association. It was first introduced in 1977 to reward the best performance by a supporting actor. In 2022, it was announced that the four acting categories would be retired and replaced with two gender neutral categories, with both Best Supporting Actor and Best Supporting Actress merging into the Best Supporting Performance category.

Winners
 † = Winner of the Academy Award for Best Supporting Actor
 ‡ = Nominated for the Academy Award for Best Supporting Actor

1970s

1980s

1990s

2000s

2010s

2020s

Multiple winners
2 wins
 Willem Dafoe (2000, 2017)
 John Gielgud (1981, 1985)
 Christopher Plummer (1999, 2011)

See also
 National Board of Review Award for Best Supporting Actor
 New York Film Critics Circle Award for Best Supporting Actor
 National Society of Film Critics Award for Best Supporting Actor
 Academy Award for Best Supporting Actor

References

Film awards for supporting actor
Los Angeles Film Critics Association Awards
Awards established in 1977
1977 establishments in California
Awards disestablished in 2021